Dorothy Gallagher (born 1931) is an American memoirist and biographer known for her two biographies All the Right Enemies, her biography on Italian-American anarchist Carlo Tresca and a 1988 New York Times Notable Book of the Year, and Lillian Hellman: An Imperious Life a critical biography of writer and playwright Lilian Hellman. She is also known for her memoirs Hannah's Daughters, How I Came into My Inheritance, Strangers in the House, and Stories I Forgot to Tell You, which memorializes her marriage to Ben Sonnenberg.

 Early life and career 
Dorothy Gallagher was born and raised in New York City. She started out as a features editor for Redbook Magazine before becoming a freelance writer whose work has been published in The New York Times Magazine, The New York Times Book Review, and Grand Street.''

References 

1931 births
American biographers
American women writers
Living people